Mo Chau, or Moon Island is an island in Tolo Channel, in the Tai Po District of Hong Kong.

See also

 Hoi Ha Wan
 Islands and peninsulas of Hong Kong

External links

 Map of Hoi Ha Wan Marine Park showing Moon Island (.pdf document)

Uninhabited islands of Hong Kong
Tai Po District
Islands of Hong Kong